DX (Digital indeX) encoding is an ANSI and I3A standard, originally introduced by Kodak in March 1983, for marking 135 and APS photographic film and film cartridges. It consists of several parts, a latent image DX film edge barcode on the film below the sprocket holes, a code on the cartridge used by automatic cameras, and a barcode on the cartridge read by photo-finishing machines.

History 

In order to simplify the handling of 35 mm film in 135 format Kodak introduced the DX encoding method on 3 January 1983. In contrast to former solutions like Fuji's film speed encoding method in 1977, which was already using electrical contacts for film speed detection on 135 format cartridges, Kodak's later DX code system immediately met success in the marketplace.

The first DX encoded film was the color negative film Kodacolor VR-1000 in March 1983.

The first cameras to use the technology was the Konica TC-X SLR (1985), as well as the compact cameras Pentax Super Sport 35 / PC 35AF-M
and Minolta AF-E / Freedom II in 1984. Pentax instead claimed the A3 / A3000 was the first DX-enabled SLR in 1985. Other DX-enabled SLRs were introduced in 1985 as well: Minolta 7000 (February 1985) and 9000 (September 1985), as well as the Nikon F-301 / N2000.

DX-iX (data exchange - information exchange) is an expanded DX encoding system introduced in 1996 to be used in conjunction with the Advanced Photo System (APS). It is only used on APS films format IX240, also known as Advantix.

In 1998, Fujifilm introduced a film identification system for 120 and 220 format roll film called Barcode System (with logo "|||B"). The barcode encoding the film format and length as well as the film speed and type is located on the sticker between the emulsion carrying film and the backing paper. This 13-bit barcode is optically scanned by newer medium format cameras like the Fujifilm GA645i Professional, GA645Wi Professional, GA645Zi Professional, GX645AF Professional, GX680III Professional, GX680IIIS Professional, Hasselblad H1, H2, H2F and H3D Model I with HM 16-32 as well as by the Contax 645 AF.

DX cartridge barcode
Next to the film exit lip is an Interleaved 2 of 5 barcode and a printed number. The six digits represent the I3A assigned DX number (middle four digits), the number of exposures (last digit) and a proprietary manufacturer's code (first digit). The DX number identifies the manufacturer, film type, and by inference, the necessary developing process type. This is used by automatic photo-finishing machines to correctly process the exposed film.

DX film edge barcode

Below the sprockets under each frame of 135 film is the DX film edge barcode. The barcode is invisible until the film has been developed. It is optically imprinted as a latent image during manufacturing. The barcode is used by photo finishers to identify each frame for printing. It consists of two parallel linear barcodes, one for a synchronizing clock called the "clock track", and the other encoding film data such as type, manufacturer and frame number, called the "data track".  The barcode nearest the film edge (away from the sprocket holes) contains the data track.  The data track sequence repeats every half frame, beginning with six start bits, followed by seven bits of DX Number Part 1, one unassigned bit, four bits of DX Number Part 2, a seven-bit frame/half-frame number, one unassigned bit, one parity bit, and finishes with four stop bits.  The seven-bit frame/half-frame number is called the "DXN" number (different than the "DX Number Part 1" and "DX Number Part 2"), and is an extension on the original DX edge code, patented by Eastman Kodak in 1990.

Some image processing software utilized by film scanners allow selection of film manufacturer and type to provide automatic color correction.  Interpreting the DX film edge barcode may provide this information, permitting accurate color correction to be applied.

DX Camera Auto Sensing
The outside of film cartridges are marked with a DX Camera Auto Sensing (CAS) code readable by many cameras. Cameras can then automatically determine the film speed, number of exposures and exposure tolerance.

The DX Camera Auto Sensing code takes the form of a grid of contact points on the side of the metal cartridge surface that are either conductive or non-conductive. Electrical contacts in the camera read the bit pattern.  Most cameras read only part of the code; typically, only the film speed is read, and some cameras aimed at the consumer market only read enough bits to tell apart the most common film speeds. For example, 100, 200, 400, and 800 can be detected by reading only S1 and S2 and ground.

Electrical contacts

On 35mm film cartridges there are two rows of six rectangular areas. The two left-most areas (with the spool post on the left) are both common (ground) and are thus always bare metal. The remaining five bits in the top row represent 32 possible film speeds. But only the 24 speeds representing the 1/3 stops from ISO 25/15° to 5000/38° are used. The codes are not in strict binary order.

In the second row, the first three bits represent eight possible film lengths, although in practice only 12, 20, 24 and 36 exposures are encoded. The remaining two bits of the second row give four ranges of exposure tolerance, or latitude.

Most cameras read the film speed only (first row).

Diagramatically (with spool post to the left):

Where "G" are the two common-ground contacts, "S" is the film speed, "L" the film length, and "T" the exposure tolerance.

Reading DX Camera Auto Sensing codes
The encoding scheme is illustrated in the truth table below using letters and color.
Where "G" is ground, "T" represents the connection to ground and "F" for the lack of connection.

See also
 DX number
 Preferred number

References

External links
 

Photographic film markings
Kodak
Audiovisual introductions in 1983